Halimium (rockrose, false sun-rose, or halimium) is a genus of 12 species of evergreen or semi-evergreen subshrubs in the family Cistaceae, closely related to Cistus. They are native to Europe, North Africa and Asia Minor, with the centre of diversity in the western Mediterranean region.

The leaves are opposite, simple oval, 1–5 cm long and 0.5–2 cm broad, varying from glossy green to tomentose grey-green. The flowers are 1.5–4 cm diameter, with five petals, white or yellow; in some species the flowers are bicoloured with a dark red or brown basal spot on each petal to act as a nectar guide for pollinating insects.

Selected species
Halimium alyssoides
Halimium atriplicifolium
Halimium calycinum (syn. H. commutatum)
Halimium halimifolium
Halimium lasianthum
Halimium ocymoides
Halimium umbellatum
Halimium verticillatum
Halimium viscosum

Cultivation and uses
Several Halimium species, and the numerous hybrids and cultivars derived from them, are widely grown as ornamental plants, popular in rockeries. A broader range of colours is available among the cultivars. 'Susan', with bright yellow flowers and a purple centre, has received the Royal Horticultural Society's Award of Garden Merit.

References

Flora Europaea: Halimium

 
Malvales genera